

Births and deaths

Births
Kate Rusby (1974)
Sean Lennon (1975)
Eliza Carthy (1975)

Deaths
 Harry Cox (1885–1971)
 Lewis 'Scan' Tester (1886–1972)
 Sandy Denny (1947–1978)

Recordings
1970: Full House (Fairport Convention)
1970: Hark! The Village Wait (Steeleye Span)
1970: The Sweet Primeroses (Shirley Collins)
1970: Please to See the King (Steeleye Span)
1971: Land Fall (Martin Carthy)
1971: No Roses (Shirley Collins)
1971: Angel Delight (Fairport Convention)
1971: Babbacombe Lee (Fairport Convention)
1971: Bless the Weather John Martyn
1972: History of Fairport Convention (Fairport Convention)
1972: Ten Man Mop, or Mr. Reservoir Butler Rides Again (Steeleye Span)
1972: Below the Salt (Steeleye Span)
1972: Soldier (Harvey Andrews)
1972: Writer of Songs (Harvey Andrews)
1973: Rosie (Fairport Convention)
1973: Nine (Fairport Convention)
1973: Parcel of Rogues (Steeleye Span)
1973: Battle of the Field (Albion Country Band)
1973: Friends of Mine (Harvey Andrews)
1974: When the Frost is on the Pumpkin (Fred Jordan)
1974: Fairport Live Convention (Fairport Convention)
1974: Now We Are Six (Steeleye Span)
1975: Rising for the Moon (Fairport Convention)
1975: Commoners Crown (Steeleye Span)
1975: All Around My Hat (album) (Steeleye Span)
1976: Gottle O'Geer (Fairport Convention)
1976: Swarbrick (Dave Swarbrick)
1976: Airs and Graces (June Tabor)
1976: Silly Sisters (Maddy Prior and June Tabor)
1976: Rocket Cottage (Steeleye Span)
1977: John Otway & Wild Willy Barrett (John Otway & Wild Willy Barrett)
1977: The Prospect Before Us (Albion Country Band)
1977: Live at the L.A. Troubadour (Fairport Convention)
1977: The Bonny Bunch of Roses (Fairport Convention)
1977: Storm Force Ten (Steeleye Span)
1978: Tipplers Tales (Fairport Convention)
1979: Farewell Farewell (Fairport Convention)

See also
Music of the United Kingdom (1970s)

English folk music by date
1970s in British music
1970s in England